Huilong Township is a township of Mao County in the southeast of the Ngawa Tibetan and Qiang Autonomous Prefecture in northern Sichuan province, China, located  northwest of the county seat as the crow flies and just west of the northern intersection of China National Highway 213 with Sichuan Provincial Highway 302. , it has four villages under its administration.

See also 
 List of township-level divisions of Sichuan

References 

Township-level divisions of Sichuan
Ngawa Tibetan and Qiang Autonomous Prefecture